A Life of Speed: The Juan Manuel Fangio Story is a 2020 documentary film directed by Francisco Macri and starring Fernando Alonso, Jackie Stewart and Mika Häkkinen. The premise revolves around Juan Manuel Fangio in the 1950s, and how he won five championships driving for four different carmakers in the F1 circuit.

Cast 
 Fernando Alonso
 Jackie Stewart
 Mika Häkkinen
 Alain Prost
 Juan Manuel Fangio
 Toto Wolff
 Carlos Reutemann
 Nico Rosberg
 Hans Herrmann
 Horacio Pagani
 Andrew Bell

Release
A Life of Speed: The Juan Manuel Fangio Story was released on March 20, 2020, on Netflix.

References

External links
 
 

2020 documentary films
2020 films
Netflix original documentary films
Argentine auto racing films
Argentine documentary films